Raw Spirit: In Search of the Perfect Dram is a nonfiction book by Iain Banks, first published in 2003. It is his only nonfiction book.

The book is about whisky, or finding the perfect dram while travelling in Scotland. Other recurring themes in the book are George W. Bush, the 2003 invasion of Iraq, and Banks' love for motor vehicles.

History
Banks has said that he "got a phone call from my agent saying that another publisher had come up with the idea of me going round distilleries in search of the perfect malt, and was I interested? Originally they wanted me to go round the Highlands in a black cab with some garrulous Glasgow cabbie or whatever, but we got rid of that idea and I drove myself."

Description
Banks tells the story of a series of road trips in (or on) some of his extensive collection of vehicles, visiting and exploring many of Scotland's finest whiskies. From early on, he brings an unpretentious approach:

The book also celebrates some of Scotland's "Great Wee Roads" (and even "Daft Wee Roads") and Banks's love for driving on them.

There are long meanders into descriptions of his friends, food, wine, and Banks's contempt for Tony Blair and George W. Bush—for example:

Banks has said he felt more relaxed when writing this book; critics said that this comes across on reading it.

Radio reading
Jimmy Chisholm read an abridgment by Laurence Wareing in the BBC Radio 4 "Book of the Week" slot between 8 December and 12 December 2003. The producer was David Young; Chisholm recorded all five of the fifteen-minute programmes on 19 November 2003.

Bibliography

References

Further reading
Reviews
 

2003 non-fiction books
Books about Scotland
Scotch whisky